"I Belong To You" is a 1974 single by the trio Love Unlimited, which was their only single to hit #1 on the R&B chart (for one week, in early 1975). It was their second and last Top 40 entry, peaking at #27.

Background
The ballad was done in a retro girl group singing style and was written and produced by Barry White.

Chart performance

Samples
Mariah Carey's "It's a Wrap" samples the song on her 2009 Island Def Jam album Memoirs of an Imperfect Angel.

References

External links
 

1974 singles
1974 songs
20th Century Fox Records singles
Songs written by Barry White